David Ettershank is an Australian politician. He is a member of the Victorian Legislative Council representing the Western Metropolitan since 26 November 2022. Ettershank is a member of Legalise Cannabis Victoria.

References 

Living people
Members of the Victorian Legislative Council
21st-century Australian politicians
Legalise Cannabis Victoria Party members of the Parliament of Victoria
Year of birth missing (living people)